Jimmy Connors won In The Final 6–2, 6–0, 5–7, 6–0, against José Higueras.

Players

Draw

Finals

Group A

Group B

References

Toronto Molson Light Challenge
Toronto Molson Light Challenge
Toronto Indoor